The 2021 FIVB Beach Volleyball World Tour was the final edition of the global elite professional beach volleyball circuit organized by the Fédération Internationale de Volleyball (FIVB) for the 2021 beach volleyball season. When it started in late February 2021, it comprised eight FIVB World Tour 4-star tournaments, three 2-star events, 17 categorized as 1-star and the World Tour Finals, all organized by the FIVB. 

The full calendar of events was updated on September 13, 2021.

Schedule
Key

Men

Women

Medal table by country

References

External links
2021 FIVB Beach Volleyball World Tour at FIVB.org

 

World Tour
2021
FIVB